Robert Wilkes Ihloff (born May 19, 1941) was thirteenth bishop of the Episcopal Diocese of Maryland from 1995 till 2007.

Early life and education
Ihloff was born on May 19, 1941 in New Britain, Connecticut, the son of Ernest Otto Ihloff and Mildred Arlene Schnippel. He studied at Ursinus College and graduated with a Bachelor of Arts in 1964. He then studied at the Episcopal Theological Seminary and graduated with a Master of Divinity in 1967. In 1971 he also graduated with a Master of Arts in European history from Central Connecticut State College. In 1978 he gained a certificate from the Boston Gestalt Institute. In 1985, he perused studies and graduated with a Doctor of Ministry from Episcopal Divinity School, with a thesis on Group Spiritual Direction.

Ordained Ministry
He was ordained deacon in 1967 and priest in 1968. After his diaconal ordination, he became curate of St Mark's Church in New Britain, Connecticut, till 1969. He then became vicar of St George's Church in Bolton, Connecticut, while in 1972 he left for Trinity church in Southport, Connecticut, to become priest-in-charge. In 1976 he became rector of St Paul's Church in Natick, Massachusetts, until becoming presiding minister of the united parish of Natick, Massachusetts, between 1980 and 1983. Between 1987 and 1995, he served as rector of Grace Episcopal Church (Madison, New Jersey).

Bishop
Ihloff was elected Bishop of Maryland on May 20, 1995 and was consecrated on October 21, 1995 in Washington National Cathedral by Presiding Bishop Edmond L. Browning. He retired in 2007. In 2018 he was appointed as Associate Bishop of Virginia.

References

External links 
Online résumé

1941 births
Living people
Episcopal bishops of Maryland
20th-century American Episcopalians
21st-century American Episcopalians
Ursinus College alumni
Episcopal Divinity School alumni
People from New Britain, Connecticut